The 1979–80 NBA season was the Rockets' 13th season in the NBA and 9th season in the city of Houston.

In the playoffs, the Rockets defeated the San Antonio Spurs in three games in the First Round, before being swept by the Boston Celtics in four games in the Semifinals.

Offseason

Draft picks

Roster

Regular season

Season standings

z – clinched division title
y – clinched division title
x – clinched playoff spot

Record vs. opponents

Game log

Regular season

|- align="center" bgcolor="#ffcccc"
| 1
| October 12, 1979
| @ Boston
| L 106–114
|
|
|
| Boston Garden
| 0–1
|- align="center" bgcolor="#ffcccc"
| 2
| October 13, 1979
| @ Philadelphia
| L 105–113
|
|
|
| The Spectrum
| 0–2
|- align="center" bgcolor="#ffcccc"
| 3
| October 16, 1979
| @ New York
| L 121–126
|
|
|
| Madison Square Garden
| 0–3
|- align="center" bgcolor="#ccffcc"
| 5
| October 20, 1979
| Atlanta
| W 107–102
|
|
|
| The Summit
| 2–3
|- align="center" bgcolor="#ffcccc"
| 6
| October 24, 1979
| Boston
| L 99–100
|
|
|
| The Summit
| 2–4
|- align="center" bgcolor="#ffcccc"
| 7
| October 28, 1979
| @ New Jersey
| L 115–120
|
|
|
| Rutgers Athletic Center
| 2–5
|- align="center" bgcolor="#ffcccc"
| 8
| October 30, 1979
| @ Cleveland
| L 112–124
|
|
|
| Richfield Coliseum
| 2–6

|- align="center" bgcolor="#ccffcc"
| 10
| November 3, 1979
| @ Detroit
| W 114–111
|
|
|
| Pontiac Silverdome
| 3–7
|- align="center" bgcolor="#ccffcc"
| 11
| November 7, 1979
| New Jersey
| W 106–101
|
|
|
| The Summit
| 4–7
|- align="center" bgcolor="#ccffcc"
| 12
| November 10, 1979
| Detroit
| W 112–104
|
|
|
| The Summit
| 5–7
|- align="center" bgcolor="#ccffcc"
| 13
| November 13, 1979
| @ Chicago
| W 128–127
|
|
|
| Chicago Stadium
| 6–7
|- align="center" bgcolor="#ccffcc"
| 14
| November 14, 1979
| Golden State
| W 133–92
|
|
|
| The Summit
| 7–7
|- align="center" bgcolor="#ccffcc"
| 15
| November 16, 1979
| New York
| W 133–130
|
|
|
| The Summit
| 8–7
|- align="center" bgcolor="#ccffcc"
| 16
| November 17, 1979
| @ Atlanta
| W 102–100
|
|
|
| The Omni
| 9–7
|- align="center" bgcolor="#ffcccc"
| 17
| November 20, 1979
| @ New York
| L 125–130 (OT)
|
|
|
| Madison Square Garden
| 9–8
|- align="center" bgcolor="#ccffcc"
| 18
| November 21, 1979
| Philadelphia
| W 97–94
|
|
|
| The Summit
| 10–8
|- align="center" bgcolor="#ffcccc"
| 19
| November 23, 1979
| @ Philadelphia
| L 102–113
|
|
|
| The Spectrum
| 10–9
|- align="center" bgcolor="#ffcccc"
| 20
| November 24, 1979
| Washington
| L 103–105
|
|
|
| The Summit
| 10–10
|- align="center" bgcolor="#ffcccc"
| 21
| November 27, 1979
| @ Kansas City
| L 115–117
|
|
|
| Municipal Auditorium
| 10–11
|- align="center" bgcolor="#ccffcc"
| 22
| November 28, 1979
| Cleveland
| W 113–111 (OT)
|
|
|
| The Summit
| 11–11
|- align="center" bgcolor="#ccffcc"
| 23
| November 30, 1979
| Atlanta
| W 106–95
|
|
|
| The Summit
| 12–11

|- align="center" bgcolor="#ccffcc"
| 24
| December 1, 1979
| Portland
| W 120–112 (OT)
|
|
|
| The Summit
| 13–11
|- align="center" bgcolor="#ffcccc"
| 25
| December 5, 1979
| Los Angeles
| L 114–116
|
|
|
| The Summit
| 13–12
|- align="center" bgcolor="#ccffcc"
| 26
| December 7, 1979
| Detroit
| W 124–109
|
|
|
| The Summit
| 14–12
|- align="center" bgcolor="#ffcccc"
| 27
| December 8, 1979
| @ San Antonio
| L 129–138
|
|
|
| HemisFair Arena
| 14–13
|- align="center" bgcolor="#ffcccc"
| 29
| December 13, 1979
| @ Phoenix
| L 113–121
|
|
|
| Arizona Veterans Memorial Coliseum
| 15–14
|- align="center" bgcolor="#ffcccc"
| 30
| December 14, 1979
| @ Seattle
| L 101–109
|
|
|
| Kingdome
| 15–15
|- align="center" bgcolor="#ffcccc"
| 31
| December 16, 1979
| @ Portland
| L 101–123
|
|
|
| Memorial Coliseum
| 15–16
|- align="center" bgcolor="#ffcccc"
| 32
| December 19, 1979
| Chicago
| L 102–108
|
|
|
| The Summit
| 15–17
|- align="center" bgcolor="#ffcccc"
| 33
| December 21, 1979
| @ Philadelphia
| L 106–117
|
|
|
| The Spectrum
| 15–18
|- align="center" bgcolor="#ffcccc"
| 34
| December 22, 1979
| @ Washington
| L 114–122
|
|
|
| Capital Centre
| 15–19
|- align="center" bgcolor="#ccffcc"
| 35
| December 26, 1979
| San Antonio
| W 143–110
|
|
|
| The Summit
| 16–19
|- align="center" bgcolor="#ffcccc"
| 36
| December 27, 1979
| @ Atlanta
| L 110–112
|
|
|
| The Omni
| 16–20
|- align="center" bgcolor="#ccffcc"
| 37
| December 29, 1979
| Philadelphia
| W 104–100
|
|
|
| The Summit
| 17–20

|- align="center" bgcolor="#ffcccc"
| 38
| January 2, 1980
| Boston
| L 103–111
|
|
|
| The Summit
| 17–21
|- align="center" bgcolor="#ffcccc"
| 39
| January 4, 1980
| @ New Jersey
| L 101–104
|
|
|
| Rutgers Athletic Center
| 17–22
|- align="center" bgcolor="#ccffcc"
| 40
| January 5, 1980
| Phoenix
| W 111–110
|
|
|
| The Summit
| 18–22
|- align="center" bgcolor="#ccffcc"
| 41
| January 8, 1980
| @ Cleveland
| W 118–115 (OT)
|
|
|
| Richfield Coliseum
| 19–22
|- align="center" bgcolor="#ccffcc"
| 43
| January 12, 1980
| Cleveland
| W 112–96
|
|
|
| The Summit
| 21–22
|- align="center" bgcolor="#ccffcc"
| 44
| January 13, 1980
| @ Milwaukee
| W 121–117
|
|
|
| MECCA Arena
| 22–22
|- align="center" bgcolor="#ffcccc"
| 45
| January 16, 1980
| New Jersey
| L 112–122
|
|
|
| The Summit
| 22–23
|- align="center" bgcolor="#ccffcc"
| 46
| January 18, 1980
| Washington
| W 134–111
|
|
|
| The Summit
| 22–24
|- align="center" bgcolor="#ffcccc"
| 47
| January 19, 1980
| @ Detroit
| L 110–122
|
|
|
| Pontiac Silverdome
| 22–25
|- align="center" bgcolor="#ffcccc"
| 48
| January 22, 1980
| @ Boston
| L 106–112
|
|
|
| Boston Garden
| 23–25
|- align="center" bgcolor="#ccffcc"
| 50
| January 26, 1980
| Seattle
| W 123–111
|
|
|
| The Summit
| 25–25
|- align="center" bgcolor="#ffcccc"
| 52
| January 30, 1980
| San Antonio
| L 111–118
|
|
|
| The Summit
| 25–27
|- align="center" bgcolor="#ffcccc"
| 53
| January 31, 1980
| Philadelphia
| L 105–110
|
|
|
| The Summit
| 25–28

|- align="center" bgcolor="#ccffcc"
| 54
| February 6, 1980
| New Jersey
| W 115–114
|
|
|
| The Summit
| 26–28
|- align="center" bgcolor="#ccffcc"
| 55
| February 8, 1980
| Cleveland
| W 105–104
|
|
|
| The Summit
| 27–28
|- align="center" bgcolor="#ccffcc"
| 57
| February 12, 1980
| @ San Antonio
| W 120–118
|
|
|
| HemisFair Arena
| 29–28
|- align="center" bgcolor="#ccffcc"
| 58
| February 13, 1980
| New York
| W 122–117
|
|
|
| The Summit
| 30–28
|- align="center" bgcolor="#ffcccc"
| 59
| February 15, 1980
| Milwaukee
| L 103–114
|
|
|
| The Summit
| 30–29
|- align="center" bgcolor="#ffcccc"
| 61
| February 20, 1980
| @ Golden State
| L 102–115
|
|
|
| Oakland-Alameda County Coliseum Arena
| 30–31
|- align="center" bgcolor="#ffcccc"
| 63
| February 24, 1980
| @ Los Angeles
| L 100–112
|
|
|
| The Forum
| 31–32
|- align="center" bgcolor="#ccffcc"
| 65
| February 27, 1980
| Washington
| W 110–97
|
|
|
| The Summit
| 33–32
|- align="center" bgcolor="#ffcccc"
| 66
| February 28, 1980
| @ Washington
| L 99–105
|
|
|
| Capital Centre
| 33–33

|- align="center" bgcolor="#ffcccc"
| 67
| March 2, 1980
| Kansas City
| L 91–94
|
|
|
| The Summit
| 34–33
|- align="center" bgcolor="#ccffcc"
| 68
| March 4, 1980
| @ Atlanta
| W 93–83
|
|
|
| The Omni
| 34–34
|- align="center" bgcolor="#ffcccc"
| 69
| March 5, 1980
| Boston
| L 99–103 (OT)
|
|
|
| The Summit
| 34–35
|- align="center" bgcolor="#ccffcc"
| 70
| March 7, 1980
| @ New Jersey
| W 111–110 (2OT)
|
|
|
| Rutgers Athletic Center
| 35–35
|- align="center" bgcolor="#ffcccc"
| 71
| March 8, 1980
| Atlanta
| L 79–97
|
|
|
| The Summit
| 35–36
|- align="center" bgcolor="#ffcccc"
| 72
| March 11, 1980
| @ New York
| L 109–129
|
|
|
| Madison Square Garden
| 35–37
|- align="center" bgcolor="#ffcccc"
| 73
| March 12, 1980
| @ Boston
| L 105–121
|
|
|
| Boston Garden
| 35–38
|- align="center" bgcolor="#ffcccc"
| 74
| March 14, 1980
| @ Washington
| L 85–92
|
|
|
| Capital Centre
| 35–39
|- align="center" bgcolor="#ccffcc"
| 75
| March 16, 1980
| @ Detroit
| W 102–99
|
|
|
| Pontiac Silverdome
| 36–39
|- align="center" bgcolor="#ccffcc"
| 76
| March 19, 1980
| New York
| W 139–113
|
|
|
| The Summit
| 37–39
|- align="center" bgcolor="#ffcccc"
| 77
| March 20, 1980
| @ Cleveland
| L 96–109
|
|
|
| Richfield Coliseum
| 37–40
|- align="center" bgcolor="#ffcccc"
| 79
| March 25, 1980
| @ San Antonio
| L 107–126
|
|
|
| HemisFair Arena
| 38–41
|- align="center" bgcolor="#ccffcc"
| 80
| March 26, 1980
| San Antonio
| W 113–101
|
|
|
| The Summit
| 39–41
|- align="center" bgcolor="#ccffcc"
| 81
| March 28, 1980
| Detroit
| W 128–112
|
|
|
| The Summit
| 40–41

Playoffs

|- align="center" bgcolor="#ccffcc"
| 1
| April 2, 1980
| San Antonio
| W 95–85
| Calvin Murphy (28)
| Moses Malone (14)
| Tom Henderson (8)
| The Summit14,454
| 1–0
|- align="center" bgcolor="#ffcccc"
| 2
| April 4, 1980
| @ San Antonio
| L 101–106
| Moses Malone (34)
| Moses Malone (19)
| Tom Henderson (10)
| HemisFair Arena12,894
| 1–1
|- align="center" bgcolor="#ccffcc"
| 3
| April 6, 1980
| San Antonio
| W 141–120
| Moses Malone (37)
| Moses Malone (20)
| Tom Henderson (10)
| The Summit15,676
| 2–1
|-

|- align="center" bgcolor="#ffcccc"
| 1
| April 9, 1980
| @ Boston
| L 101–119
| Moses Malone (27)
| Moses Malone (13)
| three players tied (4)
| Boston Garden15,320
| 0–1
|- align="center" bgcolor="#ffcccc"
| 2
| April 11, 1980
| @ Boston
| L 75–95
| Robert Reid (22)
| Robert Reid (14)
| Robert Reid (4)
| Boston Garden15,320
| 0–2
|- align="center" bgcolor="#ffcccc"
| 3
| April 13, 1980
| Boston
| L 81–100
| Moses Malone (28)
| Moses Malone (9)
| Henderson, Leavell (5)
| The Summit14,243
| 0–3
|- align="center" bgcolor="#ffcccc"
| 4
| April 14, 1980
| Boston
| L 121–138
| Moses Malone (28)
| Moses Malone (15)
| Reid, Leavell (8)
| The Summit13,106
| 0–4
|-

Player statistics

Season

Playoffs

Awards and records
Moses Malone, All-NBA Second Team

Transactions

References

See also
1979–80 NBA season

Houston Rockets seasons
Hou